Horní Maxov (German Ober Maxdorf) is a village in the town of Lučany nad Nisou in Jablonec nad Nisou District. It can be found roughly 2 km northwest from Lučany nad Nisou. As of 2008, there were 157 addresses registered here. In 2001, the village had 138 inhabitants. It lies between the Maxovski ridge and the Bramberk on Krásný hill (797 m). The highest peak of Horní Maxov is mount Slovanka (820 m) that is part of the Maxovski ridge.

Number of inhabitants of Maxov from 1719 until 2001

References

Populated places in Jablonec nad Nisou District